John Dyke may refer to:

John Dyke (cricketer)
John Dyke (rugby union)
John and Jennie Dyke

See also

John Dykes (disambiguation)